The following list includes notable people who were born or have lived in Naperville, Illinois, a city in the USA. For a similar list organized alphabetically by last name, see the category page People from Naperville, Illinois.

Authors and academics 
 Andrea Beaty, author
 Emily Giffin, author
 Louise Huffman, teacher and educator on US Antarctic programs 
 Fazlur Rahman Malik, author, scholar
 Paul Sereno, paleontologist
 Luis Alberto Urrea, author
May Theilgaard Watts, naturalist and author; led efforts to establish the Illinois Prairie Path

Media and arts 

 Dave Allen, actor
Trevor Wallace, Comedian and Content Creator
 Andrew Baggarly, baseball journalist
 Dave Bickler, singer for Survivor
 Paul Brittain, actor and comedian
 Steve Cochran, radio talk personality, WGN-AM; lives in Naperville
 David Eigenberg, actor
 Gina Glocksen, American Idol finalist
 Adrian Holovaty, journalist and web developer; creator of Django web framework
 James Holzhauer, Jeopardy all-time record-holder for one-day winnings
 P. J. Hyett (born 1982/83), software developer, and co-founder of GitHub
 Harry Kalas, sportscaster, voice of Philadelphia Phillies from 1971 to 2009
 Alan Krashesky, news anchor, WLS-TV
 Dick Locher, editorial writer and Dick Tracy cartoonist
 Gary Miller, sportscaster
 Marisol Nichols, actress, mostly known for her role as Hermione Lodge on Riverdale
 Bill Odenkirk, comedy writer, The Simpsons
 Bob Odenkirk, actor, comedian, writer, director, producer, star of Better Call Saul
 Danielle Panabaker, actress most notable for her role as Dr. Caitlin Snow on The Flash. She spent her teenage years in Naperville.
 Kay Panabaker, child actress (Phil of the Future, No Ordinary Family). She was raised in Naperville.
 Chris Redd, cast member on Saturday Night Live
Alene Robertson, musical theatre actress, winner of nine Joseph Jefferson Awards and 2014 Sarah Siddons Award
 Hillary Scott, pornographic actress
 Jim Sonefeld, drummer for Hootie and the Blowfish
 Kim Spencer, founder of the WorldLink direct broadcast satellite channel, producer of Space Bridge live TV broadcasts simultaneously connecting audiences and presenters on multiple continents
 Darling Squire, dancer and choreographer
 Doug Walker, web reviewer, Nostalgia Critic
 Paula Zahn, newscaster and television personality

Politics 

 Mary Lou Cowlishaw, politician
S. Fitzgerald Haney, U.S. Ambassador to Costa Rica
Dick Locher, syndicated cartoonist
 Joseph Naper, shipbuilder, businessman, politician, settler, founder of Naperville
 A. George Pradel, longest-serving mayor in city's history
 J. Glenn Schneider, educator and politician
 Robert Zoellick, retired president of World Bank
 Lauren Underwood, politician

Sports

Prize Fighting 
 Curtis Blaydes, UFC fighter
 Jordan Johnson, RFA World Champ, UFC fighter
 Steve Kozola, MMA fighter

Baseball 

 Ryan Bukvich, relief pitcher for Chicago White Sox
 Bert Haas, first baseman for five MLB teams; National League All-Star (1947)
 Jerry Hairston Jr., played for nine MLB teams; World Series champion (2009)
 Ian Krol, free agent relief pitcher
 Nicky Lopez, 2nd baseman for Kansas City Royals
 Collin McHugh, pitcher for Atlanta Braves

Basketball 

 John Clawson, forward for University of Michigan and ABA champion Oakland Oaks; Olympic gold medalist 1968 Olympics
 Drew Crawford (born 1990), basketball player who last played for Bnei Herzliya of the Israeli Ligat HaAl
 Porter Moser, head coach for University of Oklahoma men's basketball
 Anthony Parker, shooting guard and small forward for Toronto Raptors and Cleveland Cavaliers; 2004 Israeli Basketball Premier League MVP; current general manager of NBA G League's Lakeland Magic.
 Candace Parker, forward for University of Tennessee and WNBA champions Los Angeles Sparks and Chicago Sky; two-time league MVP; two-time Olympic gold medalist

Football 

 Cameron Brate, tight end for Tampa Bay Buccaneers
 Chris Brown, running back for Tennessee Titans
 Owen Daniels, tight end for Denver Broncos
 Justin McCareins, wide receiver for Tennessee Titans and New York Jets
 Babatunde Oshinowo, defensive lineman for Chicago Bears
 Sean Payton, head coach of New Orleans Saints, 2006 NFL Coach of the Year

Gymnastics 

 Bridgette Caquatto, gymnast on U.S national team World silver medalist
 Mackenzie Caquatto, gymnast on U.S national team
 Nia Dennis, gymnast on U.S. national team

Ice skating 

 Evan Lysacek, figure skater; Olympic gold medalist (2010), 2-time national champion
E-Biking

 John Doyle

Soccer 

 Aidan Liu, defender for Vejle BK
 Brittany Bock, defender for WPS franchise Western New York Flash
Vanessa DiBernardo, midfielder for Chicago Red Stars
 Megan Oyster, defender for Reign FC
Casey Short,  defender for Chicago Red Stars and U.S. national women's team

Track and field 

 Chris Derrick, distance runner at Stanford, held junior record in 5000m
 Tom Petranoff, javelin thrower, former world record holder, Olympian

Swimming 

Kevin Cordes, Olympic gold medalist in 4x100-meter medley relay, American record holder in 100- and 200-meter breaststroke (short course), as well as 100- and 200-yard breaststroke.

Volleyball 

Jordyn Poulter, Olympic gold medalist for the United States national indoor volleyball team & professional volleyball player.

Mountain Climbing 

 Lucy Westlake, youngest American Woman to summit Mount Everest.

References

Naperville
Naperville